Holly Farrell (born 1961) is a Canadian painter. 

Nostalgia drives her subject matter, still life being her main focus. Farrell considers her still life paintings to be simple meditations on people and places she has known – there is a sense of the portrait in everything that she paints. Farrell's subjects are the common, everyday tools of day-to-day existence – things that many people are able to project their own experiences onto.

Farrell says:

"Homely is how I would describe most of my subjects. It’s how I feel when I look at my paintings, whether I am connecting to something, someone, or some time.  A clear line is drawn to people who are closest to me. My cookbook series is an homage to my mother…memories of her baking pies, roasting roasts – memories of her standing behind the counter of our family diner, lipstick on cigarettes and coffee cups.  Chairs, bowls, clocks…other domestic tools…functional things that now hold special meaning, allowing us to reach back for a moment and maybe experience a bit of the past."  Holly Farrell - 2017.

Farrell's work has been exhibited in Canada, the U.S., England, and Japan.  Her paintings are in corporate and private collections throughout North America, Europe, Australia and Japan including: BMO, Canada; William Louis-Dreyfus Family Collection (Gérard Louis-Dreyfus), U.S.A., and Sony Music,

Painting
Farrell began to paint at 30. She exhibited her first paintings at the Toronto Outdoor Art Exhibition in 1992.  Between 1992 and 2000 she focussed on honing her drawing and painting skills, while building a following in Toronto.  By 2005 Farrell had gained attention in such publications as Toronto Life, The Toronto Star, and the Globe And Mail.  The Star's Peter Goddard said about Farrell's 2003 show:

"Yet her works share with his (Morandi's) sense of discovery, as if you've never seen what you're seeing as quite as memorable as they now seem. It's as if the artists added something unseen to their mass. Gravity's pull on them feels much greater than it should be. Like Morandi's, Farrell's work denies any critical attempt to mine them for symbolic content. If they're about childhood, no analysts allowed.  Same too, with the objects she uses - or the objects she comes upon. Her paintings act as spies, seemingly catching their subject unprepared.

- Peter Goddard, 2003.

With the advent of the internet Farrell expanded her reach to connect with galleries and clients in the U.S.  She participated in Folk Fest Art Fair in Atlanta Georgia where she connected with Karen Light, owner of Garde Rail Gallery.  Light exhibited Farrell's work in shows at Garde Rail Gallery in Seattle, garnering reviews from the Seattle Post Intelligencer as well as Seattle Weekly.  Light was also instrumental in introducing Farrell's paintings to the New York Outsider Art Fair.

References

1961 births
Living people
21st-century Canadian painters
Artists from Ontario
People from North Bay, Ontario
Canadian women painters
21st-century Canadian women artists